The Vienna Radio Symphony Orchestra (German: ORF Radio-Symphonieorchester Wien, or RSO Wien) is the orchestra of the Austrian national broadcaster Österreichischer Rundfunk (ORF). Unlike most other Austrian orchestras, the RSO Wien has a substantial focus on contemporary classical music.

History
Founded in 1969 with the name of the ORF-Symphonieorchester (ORF Symphony Orchestra), it is the only radio orchestra in the country. It acquired its current name in 2009.

The orchestra performs in a number of venues, including Radiokulturhaus (in Vienna), Konzerthaus, Vienna, Theater an der Wien and Musikverein.

Milan Horvat was the orchestra's first chief conductor, from 1969 to 1975. During the tenure of Bertrand de Billy as chief conductor, from 2002 to 2010, he had disputes with management over funding and the continuing status of the orchestra.  In January 2009, the RSO Wien announced the appointment of Cornelius Meister as its seventh chief conductor, effective with the 2010–2011 season and with an initial contract through August 2014. Meister has conducted the Vienna RSO in a commercial recording of the music of Gottfried von Einem.  In April 2016, the orchestra announced that Meister is to conclude his Vienna RSO tenure in 2018, at the end of his most recent contract extension.

In 2014, Marin Alsop first guest-conducted the Vienna RSO.  In January 2018, the Vienna RSO announced the appointment of Alsop as its next chief conductor, effective 1 September 2019, with an initial contract of 3 years.  She is the first female conductor to be named chief conductor of the Vienna RSO.  Alsop took the title of chief conductor designate with immediate effect, through the 2018–2019 season.  The current Intendant of the orchestra is Christoph Becher.

Chief conductors
Milan Horvat (1969–1975)
Leif Segerstam (1975–1982)
Lothar Zagrosek (1982–1986)
Pinchas Steinberg (1989–1996)
Dennis Russell Davies (1996–2002)
Bertrand de Billy (2002–2010)
Cornelius Meister (2010–2018)
Marin Alsop (2019–present)

See also
 Radio orchestra

References

Further reading

External links

  

Musical groups established in 1969
Austrian orchestras
Radio and television orchestras
Musical groups from Vienna